Antoine Winfield may refer to:

Antoine Winfield Sr. (born 1977), American football cornerback
Antoine Winfield Jr. (born 1998), American football safety